

Rulers 
Note that dates are quite uncertain for most Makurian rulers.

Bibliography 
Derek A. Welsby: The Medieval Kingdoms of Nubia, British Museum Press, London 2002, pp. 259–61

Notes

See also
Makuria
Nubia

Nubian people
Makuria
History of Nubia

de:Liste der nubischen Könige